Niesthrea sidae is a species of scentless plant bug in the family Rhopalidae. It is found in the Caribbean Sea, Central America, North America, and South America.

References

Articles created by Qbugbot
Insects described in 1794
Rhopalinae